Henry Christopher Leddy (born 1884; date of death unknown) was an Irish professional footballer who played as a centre-half.

References

1884 births
Association footballers from Dublin (city)
Irish association footballers (before 1923)
Association football defenders
Belfast Celtic F.C. players
Lisburn Distillery F.C. players
Glenavon F.C. players
Shelbourne F.C. players
Clyde F.C. players
Belfast United F.C. players
Tranmere Rovers F.C. players
Everton F.C. players
Chesterfield F.C. players
Grimsby Town F.C. players
Shamrock Rovers F.C. players
Frankfort F.C. players
English Football League players
Year of death missing